Highpoint Hillbrow is a skyscraper in Hillbrow, Johannesburg, South Africa. It was built in 1972 to a height of 105 metres. The building is mostly apartments built on top of a large shopping centre and cinema.

See also 
 List of tallest buildings in South Africa

References

External links 
 Amethyst: Johannesburg Landmarks. Retrieved 11 February 2008.

Buildings and structures completed in 1972
Skyscrapers in Johannesburg
Residential skyscrapers in South Africa
20th-century architecture in South Africa